The Tamarama Surf Life Saving Club was founded in 1906 and operates at Tamarama Beach, Sydney. The clubhouse sits at the northern end of the beach.

The club was formed after a dispute between local beach-goers and the operator of an amusement park, Wonderland City, on the beachfront. The operator erected a fence to prohibit access to the amusement park from the beach, but the fence had the effect of obstructing public access to the beach. The surfers and swimmers prevailed when the New South Wales government declared the beach to be public land, and some of them subsequently formed the surf life saving club.

Tamarama Beach has a reputation for danger, due to its strong rip currents. Surf Life Saving New South Wales regards it as the state's most dangerous patrolled beach. However, there has never been a death at the beach while it has been patrolled.

See also

Surf lifesaving
Surf Life Saving Australia
List of Australian surf lifesaving clubs

References

Further reading

External links
 

1906 establishments in Australia
Sports clubs established in 1906
Surf Life Saving Australia clubs
Sporting clubs in Sydney